These are the Canadian number-one country albums of 1994, per the RPM Country Albums chart.

1994
1994 record charts
1994 in Canadian music